Margolin is a surname that, like its variants,  is derived from the Hebrew word  (margoliyot) whose meaning is "pearls",

Variants of the name are: Margolis, Margulis, Margules, Margolio(u)th, Margoliut(h), Margo, Margolinski, Marliss, etc.

Names like Perlman, Perelman, Perlstein, etc. have the same meaning.

The surname "Margolin" may refer to:

 Anna Margolin, pen name of Rosa Harning Lebensboym (1887–1952), Jewish Russian-American, Yiddish language poet
 Arnold Margolin, American television producer, screenwriter, and director
 Bessie Margolin, American attorney
 Bob Margolin, American guitarist
 Bruce Margolin, American criminal defense attorney
 Carol Margolin, American artist known as Carol Heifetz Neiman
Dansette (J. & A. Margolin Ltd)
 Deb Margolin, American performance artist and playwright
 Efraim Margolin, Israeli-American businessman and philanthropist
 Howie Margolin, member of The Demensions group
 Janet Margolin, American actress
 Jody Margolin Hahn, American television director
 Julius Margolin, Israeli writer and political activist
 Malcolm Margolin, American publisher, author
 Phillip Margolin, American writer and lawyer
 Quintin Corinne Margolin, American actress known as Quentin Dean
 Reuben Heyday Margolin, American artist and sculptor
 Stacy Margolin (born 1959), American tennis player
 Stuart Margolin (1940-2022), American actor
 Veniamin Margolin, Russian trumpeter
 Victor Margolin, art historian

See also

Notes

References

Jewish surnames
Hebrew-language surnames